Don't You Know may refer to:

"Don't You Know?", a song written by Bobby Worth and first recorded by Della Reese, 1959
"Don't You Know" (Alexia song), the English version of "Dimmi come...", 2002
"Don't You Know" (Kungs song), 2016
"Don't You Know" (Pandora song), 1995
"Don't You Know (She Said Hello)", a song by Butterscotch, 1970
"Don't You Know", a song by Atomic Kitten from Ladies Night, 2003
"Don't You Know", a song by Devo from Freedom of Choice, 1980
"Don't You Know", a song by Durand Jones & The Indications, 2018
"Don't You Know", a song by Jacob Collier from In My Room, 2016
"Don't You Know", a song by Madonna from Pre-Madonna, 1997
"Don't You Know", a song by Young Jeezy from The Recession, 2008